Æthelberht, Aethelbert or Ethelbert is a masculine given name which may refer to:

People

Æthelberht
 Æthelberht of Kent (c. 550–616), King of Kent
 Æthelred and Æthelberht (died c. 669), possibly legendary princes of Kent, saints and martyrs
 Æthelberht, king of the Hwicce
 Æthelbert of Sussex, King of Sussex
 Alberht of East Anglia (8th century), also Æthelberht I of East Anglia, ruler of East Anglia
 Æthelbert II of Kent (725–762), King of Kent
 Æthelbert of York (died 780), Archbishop of York, scholar and teacher
 Æthelberht II of East Anglia (died 794), saint and King of East Anglia
 Æthelberht of Whithorn (died 797), Bishop of Whithorn
 Æthelberht, King of Wessex (died 865)

Ethelbert
 Ethelbert Barksdale (1824–1893), American and Confederate politician
 Ethelbert Blatter (1877–1934), Swiss Jesuit priest and pioneering botanist in British India
 E. W. Bullinger (1837–1913), Anglican clergyman, biblical scholar and theologian
 Ethelbert Callahan (1829–1918), American lawyer and politician
 Ethelbert Nevin (1862–1901), American pianist and composer
 Ethelbert I. Singley (1888–1967), American politician
 Ethelbert Stauffer (1902–1979), German Protestant theologian and numismatist
 Ethelbert Talbot (1848–1928), 15th presiding bishop of the Episcopal Church
 Ethelbert Dudley Warfield (1861–1936), American professor of history and college president
 Ethelbert Watts (1846–1919), American diplomat in World War I
 Ethelbert White (1891–1972), English wood engraver and painter

Animals
 Ethelbert (orca), a whale that swam up the Columbia River

Old English given names
Masculine given names